In enzymology, a sepiapterin deaminase is an enzyme that catalyzes the chemical reaction

sepiapterin + H2O  xanthopterin-B2 + NH3

Thus, the two substrates of this enzyme are sepiapterin and H2O, whereas its two products are xanthopterin-B2 and NH3.

This enzyme belongs to the family of hydrolases, those acting on carbon-nitrogen bonds other than peptide bonds, specifically in cyclic amidines.  The systematic name of this enzyme class is sepiapterin aminohydrolase.

References 

 

EC 3.5.4
Enzymes of unknown structure